The Saadist Institutional Party was an Egyptian political party. It was established in 1938 as a split-off from the Wafd party. Ahmed Maher Pasha and Mahmoud Fahmy Elnokrashy Pasha were on one side and party secretary Makram Ebeid was on the other. Party head Mostafa el-Nahhas took the side of Makram and dismissed Maher and Elnokrashy. The dismissed leaders created the new party.

Mahmoud Fahmy Elnokrashy who served as the prime minister of Egypt from December 1946 to December 1948 was the member of the party. Ibrahim Abdel Hady Pasha, another prime minister of Egypt between 1948 and 1949 and the successor of Mahmoud Elnokrashy Pasha, was also a member of the party.

Electoral history

House of Representatives elections

References

Defunct political parties in Egypt